Laurent Bouhnik (born 7 April 1961) is a French director, writer, and actor.

Bouhnik began his career in the comic strip and illustration business. From 1988 to 1992, he worked technical image and editing jobs within his production company.

Bouhnik's film  Madeleine (1999) was the first step in  his project to direct one film per year between 1999 and 2009, recounting the turn of the century France in an interweaving narrative pattern.

Bouhnik teaches directing and script-writing at La Fémis in Paris. He has appeared in cameo roles in Vivante (2001), Sur un air d'autoroute (1999) and Paddy (1998).

Selected filmography

References

External links 

French film directors
1961 births
Living people